Hadramphus stilbocarpae, commonly known as the knobbled weevil, is a species of weevil in the family Curculionidae. Endemic to New Zealand, it was first described by Guillermo Kuschel in 1971.

References 

Beetles of New Zealand